Makhiny is a rural locality (a khutor) in Kruglovskoye Rural Settlement, Nekhayevsky District, Volgograd Oblast, Russia. The population was 25 as of 2010.

Geography 
Makhiny is located on the Peskovatka River, 32 km southwest of Nekhayevskaya (the district's administrative centre) by road. Kruglovka is the nearest rural locality.

References 

Rural localities in Nekhayevsky District